Curtis Harris (February 14, 1905 – August 3, 1947), born "Curtis Taplan", and nicknamed "Popeye", was an American Negro league infielder between 1931 and 1940.

A native of Washington County, Texas, Harris made his Negro leagues debut in 1931 for the Pittsburgh Crawfords. With the Kansas City Monarchs in 1936, he was selected as the West team's starting first baseman at the East–West All-Star Game. Harris finished his career with the Philadelphia Stars, where he played from 1937 to 1940. He died in Los Angeles, California in 1947 at age 42.

References

External links
 and Baseball-Reference Black Baseball stats and Seamheads

1905 births
1947 deaths
Kansas City Monarchs players
Philadelphia Stars players
Pittsburgh Crawfords players
Baseball players from Texas
People from Washington County, Texas
20th-century African-American sportspeople
Baseball infielders